Chinatown station is an elevated light rail station on the L Line of the Los Angeles Metro Rail system. It is located along Spring Street above College Street in the Chinatown neighborhood of Los Angeles, just north of Downtown Los Angeles. This station opened on July 26, 2003, as part of the original Gold Line, then known as the "Pasadena Metro Blue Line" project.

The Chinatown station is a short walk from North Broadway, a bustling street of Chinese-American restaurants and stores. Broadway is accessible through a paseo in Blossom Plaza lined with businesses that connects to a plaza at the elevation of the station platform.

This station and all the other original and Foothill Extension stations will be part of the A Line upon completion of the Regional Connector project in 2023.

Service

Station layout

Hours and frequency

Connections 
, the following connections are available:
Los Angeles Metro Bus: 
City of Santa Clarita Transit: 799
LADOT Commuter Express: , 
LADOT DASH: B, Lincoln Heights/Chinatown

Notable places nearby 
 Chinese Historical Society of Southern California
 Dodger stadium
 Los Angeles State Historic Park
 Thien Hau Temple

References

External links

L Line (Los Angeles Metro) stations
Chinatown, Los Angeles
Railway stations in the United States opened in 2003